Lodja is a village in Saarde Parish, Pärnu County, in southwestern Estonia.

References

Villages in Pärnu County